The International Polo Club Palm Beach, located in Wellington, Florida, is one of the largest polo clubs in the world. The club includes several natural grass polo fields, two of which are part of stadiums.

History
Once home to humble agricultural lands, Wellington, Florida, has been developed into a world-famous equestrian community. The sport of polo has been a major contributor to the city's development. In 1978, William T. Ylvisaker created polo fields and introduced the mallet and ball game to the city. In the late 1990s, private polo fields owned by Summerfield Johnston, Jr., Mickey Tarnapol, and John B. Goodman were combined to create a platform for high-goal competition. In 2002, John B. Goodman, patron of the Isla Carroll Polo team, took stewardship of these fields and founded the International Polo Club Palm Beach (IPC). The club then gained the guardianship of the 26-goal C.V. Whitney Cup polo tournament. In 2004, IPC set forth on its inaugural season while construction of the clubhouse and stadium were underway. In the following years, more polo fields were added, along with grandstands, private boxes, and other amenities. In 2013, IPC celebrated its 10th anniversary season.

Amenities
The main stadium holds approximately 1,640 spectators, making it the largest structure for viewing polo in the United States. Championship Field is used for Sunday matches during the winter season, and also for USPA junior polo tournaments, summer sports, equestrian-themed weddings, and corporate events.

The club has nine polo fields, an Olympic-size pool, a spa and fitness center, and a tournament-approved croquet lawn and club. It also has two tennis courts and a tennis pavilion, a wine room, and the largest collection of polo books on earth.

The restaurant seats 120 and is named The Mallet Grille after its famous mallet sculpture centerpiece designed by M. Maison, the club’s designer. The centerpiece contains 120 mallets metaphorically representing the capacity of the restaurant. Lance is the Maitre' D/ assistant manager of the restaurant and a great asset to the club. The club bar is called the 7th Chukker.

The Pavilion is located across from Championship Field and is used for special functions, including Sunday Brunch and Polo, which is a mainstay during the 16-week winter season. The Pavilion seats 500 and has a large commercial kitchen, its own culinary staff separate from the club, and a covered veranda with views of the polo field.

22 goal polo tournaments

C.V. Whitney Cup
USPA Gold Cup
U.S. Open Polo Championship

Other sporting events
IPC hosts non-polo sporting events, including the Junior District Lacrosse Championship, American Youth Soccer Organization National Games, Ultimate Frisbee Tournaments, the National Field Hockey Championship, and the National Field Hockey Festival, among others.

Past tenants
From 2000-2008, IPC was the home venue for the Palm Beach Pumas, a member of the USL Premier Development League. IPC was a major sponsor of the Pumas.

Management
John A. Wash, CCM was President of Club Operations from 2007 - 2016.  After nine (9) years at the helm of The Wanderers Golf Club and The International Polo Club, a joint leadership role, John’s tenure ended in May with the sale of both club properties by the Goodman Children's Trust after two criminal trials and one civil trial of John Goodman for DUI Manslaughter & leaving the scene.
Still, Wash delivered 52% increase in club net income of $2.2 million thru a 28.3% top-line growth of $1.6 million. 
During his tenure, The International Polo Club achieved the following awards; 
2013 Recipient of the President’s Award by The Palm Beach County Sports Commission, 
2013 Recipient of the Providencia Award by Palm Beach County Convention and Visitors Bureau, and the 
2014 Business of the Year.

External links
 Official website

References

Sports venues in Florida
Polo clubs in the United States
Soccer venues in Florida
Tennis venues in Florida
Wellington, Florida
2002 establishments in Florida
Sports venues completed in 2002